Accademia Arcadia, sometimes called Arcadia, is an Australian baroque ensemble formed in 2001 by Jacqueline Ogeil. Their album Trio Sonatas received a nomination for the 2007 ARIA Award for Best Classical Album.

Members
Jacqueline Ogeil - organ
Rosanne Hunt - cello
Josephine Vains - cello
Davide Monti - violin
Lucinda Moon - violin
Rachel Beesley - violin
Julia Fredersdorf - violin
Catherine Shugg - violin
Ross Mitchell - violin
John Quaine - violin
Ruth Wilkinson - viola da gamba
Margaret Pearce - soprano
Margaret Pearce - soprano
Michael Leighton Jones - bass

Discography

Albums

Awards and nominations

ARIA Music Awards
The ARIA Music Awards is an annual awards ceremony that recognises excellence, innovation, and achievement across all genres of Australian music. They commenced in 1987. 

! 
|-
| 2007 
| Trio Sonatas
| Best Classical Album
| 
| 
|-

References

External links
About Accademia Arcadia

Australian classical music groups
Musical groups established in 2001